Baabda is the capital city of Baabda District as well as the capital of Mount Lebanon Governorate, western Lebanon. Baabda was the capital city of the autonomous Ottoman Mount Lebanon. Baabda is known for the Ottoman Castle (the serail) and it has many embassies (Italian, Japanese, Jordanian, Polish, Ukrainian, Romanian, Indonesian, Spanish ... ), the Ministry of Defense and many important organization and administrative centres in Lebanon.

Baabda Palace, residence of the President of Lebanon is also located in Baabda. The palace was built in 1956 on a hill in the mountain town of Baabda overlooking the Lebanese capital, Beirut. The first President to reside in it was President Charles Helou (25 September 1913 – 7 January 2001)

During his two years, 1988 to 1990, as Lebanon's interim Prime Minister, Michel Aoun took up residence in the Baabda Palace surrounded by those troops from the Lebanese army who had remained loyal to him.

Also in Baabda, Dany Chamoun was assassinated with his family in 1990, after Aoun had fled the presidential palace to seek shelter in the French Embassy in Baabda.

Gallery

References

Greater Beirut
Populated places in Baabda District